Arida is a village in northern Lebanon, on the Syrian border, which is formed by the mouth of the Nahr al-Kabir al-Janoubi. It is located in the Akkar District of the Akkar Governorate. Its inhabitants are Sunni Muslims. The Arida Border Crossing is the coastal border crossing between Lebanon and Syria.

References

Populated places in Akkar District
Sunni Muslim communities in Lebanon
Populated coastal places in Lebanon